Arkin may refer to:

 Arkin, Iran, a village in Zanjan Province, Iran
 Arkin, Khodabandeh, a village in Zanjan Province, Iran
 Adam Arkin (born 1956), American actor and director
 Alan Arkin (born 1934), American actor
 Esther Arkin, Israeli–American mathematician and computer scientist
 Shy Arkin (born 1965), Israeli professor of biochemistry
 Cüneyt Arkın (1937-2022), Turkish film actor, director, producer and martial artist.

See also
 
 Arka (disambiguation)
 Arkinda, Arkansas